Pablo Castro may refer to:

 Pablo Castro Estevez (born 1959), Argentine architect
 Pablo Castro (writer), pseudonym of the Spanish writer Nuria C. Botey (born 1977)
 Pablo Castro (footballer) (born 1985), Uruguayan footballer